Bozmirabad (also Romanized as Bozmīrābād, Bazmīrābād, Bezmīrābād, and Bozmīr Ābād; also known as Bīzmarābād) is a village in Posht Tang Rural District, in the Central District of Sarpol-e Zahab County, Kermanshah Province, Iran. At the 2006 census, its population was 1,033, in 192 families. The village is populated by Kurds.

References 

Populated places in Sarpol-e Zahab County
Kurdish settlements in Kermanshah Province